Nycteronyssus is a genus of bird mites in the family Macronyssidae.

References

Mesostigmata
Articles created by Qbugbot